Bernard Quilfen (20 April 1949 – 29 January 2022) was a French professional road bicycle racer, who won a stage in the 1977 Tour de France.

Quilfen was born in Argenteuil, Val-d'Oise. After his cycling career, Quilfen became a directeur sportif. He led the Cofidis team from the 1997 Tour de France. 

Quilfen died on 29 January  2022, at the age of 72.

Major results

1977
Pontoise (FRA)
Tour de France:
1st stage 14

References

External links 
 
 Official Tour de France results for Bernard Quilfen

1949 births
2022 deaths
French male cyclists
French Tour de France stage winners
Sportspeople from Argenteuil
Cyclists from Île-de-France